Plectiscus is a genus of parasitoid wasps belonging to the family Ichneumonidae.

The genus has almost cosmopolitan distribution.

Species:
 Plectiscus agilis (Holmgren, 1858) 
 Plectiscus agilitor Aubert, 1981

References

Ichneumonidae
Ichneumonidae genera